The Lake LA-250 Renegade is a six-seat amphibious utility aircraft produced in the United States by Lake Aircraft since 1982.

Design and development
The Renegade is a lengthened and more powerful version of the Lake Buccaneer. They share the Buccaneer's type certificate, and Buccaneer production was terminated. In turn, it gave rise to a number of variants, including the militarised LA-250 Seawolf, the turbocharged LA-270 Turbo Renegade, and the LA-270 Seafury optimised for marine environments. Like the Buccaneer, it is a conventional mid-wing design with retractable tricycle undercarriage and a single engine mounted in pusher configuration in a pod on a pylon above the fuselage.

The Seawolf version was designed for light maritime patrol duties and features a hardpoint under each wing to carry external stores, including bombs, rocket pods, gun pods, or rescue equipment. Provision for a radar unit was made on the forward end of the engine pod. The Seafury includes improved anti-corrosion measures and a hardened interior to improve its serviceability in saltwater environments, as well as a storage compartment carrying survival gear.

Operational history
On August 31, 1988, Peter Foster and Robert Mann departed Sanford Seacoast Regional Airport in a Lake Turbo  Renegade, flying to a maximum altitude of 24,600 feet and then leveling off at 24,500 feet. This flight set new world records for altitude and sustained flight at altitude for single-engine amphibians, FAI class C-3C-08.

A year later on November 2, 1989, two more flights departed from Bauneg Beg Lake in Sanford, Maine, setting four more world records for single-engine seaplanes. In the first flight of the day, Robert Mann flew a Lake Turbo Renegade N270TL with co-pilot Gordon Collins to an altitude of 25,500 feet. They were able to sustain this altitude, setting two records for FAI class C-2C-08. Later in the day, Robert Mann flew N250L solo from Bauneg Beg Lake to an initial altitude of 27,300 feet, and then leveling off at a sustained altitude of 27,100 feet for two more world records in FAI class C-2B-08.

Variants
 LA-250 Renegade — Buccaneer with 38-inch (97-cm) fuselage stretch, six seats, and Lycoming IO-540-C4B5 engine
 LA-250 Seawolf — militarised Renegade with hardpoints and provision for radar
 LA-270 Turbo Renegade — Renegade with Lycoming TIO-540-AA1AD engine uprated to 270 hp (200 kW)
 LA-270 Seafury — Renegade for saltwater conditions

Specifications (LA-250)

Notes

References

External links

1980s United States civil utility aircraft
Single-engined pusher aircraft
Renegade
Amphibious aircraft
Mid-wing aircraft
Aircraft first flown in 1982
Flying boats